Attleboro is a city in Bristol County, Massachusetts, United States. It was once known as "The Jewelry Capital of the World" for its many jewelry manufacturers. According to the 2020 census, Attleboro had a population of 46,461.

History
In 1634, English settlers first arrived in the territory that is now Attleboro. The deed that granted them the land was written by Native American Wamsutta. The land was divided in 1694 as the town of Attleborough. It included the towns of Cumberland, Rhode Island, until 1747 and North Attleborough, Massachusetts, until 1887. In 1697 in response to an unwanted amount of disturbances, mainly from nearby tribes of natives, the town had a meeting and ended up deciding that selectmen would keep tabs on strangers and foreigners as well as banning certain ones from entering the town. The town was reincorporated in 1914 as the City of Attleboro, with the "-ugh" removed from the name, although North Attleborough kept it. Like many towns in Massachusetts, it was named for a British town.

During the Native American insurgency in the colonial era, Nathaniel Woodcock, the son of an Attleborough resident, was murdered, and his head was placed on a pole in his father's front yard. His father's house is now a historical site. It is rumored that George Washington once passed through Attleborough and stayed near the Woodcock Garrison House at the Hatch Tavern, where he exchanged a shoe buckle with Israel Hatch, a revolutionary soldier and the new owner of the Garrison House.

The city became known for jewelry manufacturing in 1913, particularly because of the L.G. Balfour Company. That company has since moved out of the city, and the site of the former plant has been converted into a riverfront park. Attleboro was once known as "The Jewelry Capital of the World", and jewelry manufacturing firms continue to operate there. One such is the Guyot Brothers Company, which was started in 1904. General Findings, M.S. Company, James A. Murphy Co., Garlan Chain, Leach & Garner, and Masters of Design are jewelry manufacturing companies still in operation.

Cancer cluster
In late 2003, The Sun Chronicle reported that a state investigation had been launched into the deaths of four women in the city from glioblastoma. In 2007, the State of Massachusetts issued a report concluding that although the diagnosis rate for brain and central nervous system (CNS) cancers was higher than expected when compared to statewide data, the increase was determined not to be statistically significant.

Scorecard, Environmental Defense's online database of polluters, lists seven facilities contributing to cancer hazards in Attleboro, including Engineered Materials Solutions Inc., the worst offender in Massachusetts.

Shpack Landfill contamination incident
In 2002, the Massachusetts Public Health Department was asked to evaluate the former Shpack Landfill, on the border of Norton and Attleboro, for its cancer risks. The investigation continued at least through 2004. The informal landfill included uranium fuel rods, heavy metals, and volatile organic compounds.

Geography

Its borders form an irregular polygon that resembles a truncated triangle pointing west. It is bordered by North Attleborough to the north, Mansfield and Norton to the east, Rehoboth, Seekonk, and Pawtucket, Rhode Island, to the south, and Cumberland, Rhode Island, to the west, as well as sharing a short border with Central Falls, Rhode Island through the Blackstone River. It includes the areas known as City Center, Briggs Corner, West Attleboro, East Corner, East Attleboro, North Corner, Maple Square, Camp Hebron, Oak Hill, Dodgeville, East Junction, Hebronville, Park Square, and South Attleboro.

The Ten Mile River, fed by the Bungay River and by several brooks, runs through the center of Attleboro. The Manchester Pond Reservoir lies beside Interstate 95, and there are several small ponds in the city. There are over 20 conservation areas amounting to more than 600 acres of walkable woods: the Antony Lawrence Preserve, Coleman Reservation, Attleboro Springs, and the Bungay River Conservation Area in the north of the city. Attleboro's highest point is  Oak Hill, in the southern part of the city, north of Oak Hill Avenue.

Attleboro is on the border between the Massachusetts and Rhode Island regional dialects of New England English: the eastern part of the city is in the same dialect region as Boston, and the western part in the same dialect region as Providence.

Demographics

Attleboro is part of the Providence metropolitan area. It is a short distance from Boston, and is linked to the Boston metropolitan area.

The racial makeup of the city was 87.1% White, 3.0% African American, 0.2% Native American, 4.5% Asian (1.5% Cambodian,1.3% Indian, 0.4% Chinese, 0.4% Vietnamese) 0.1% Pacific Islander, 2.8% some other race, and 2.2% from two or more races. Hispanic and Latino people of any race made up 6.3% of the total (2.0% Puerto Rican, 1.7% Guatemalan, 0.5% Mexican, 0.4% Salvadoran, 0.3% Dominican, 0.2% Colombian). Most of the Hispanic and Asian populations were concentrated in the East Side.

Of the 16,884 households, 33.3% had someone under the age of 18 living with them, 50.1% were headed by married couples living together, 11.3% had a female householder with no husband present, 33.6% were non-families, 26.4% were individuals, and 9.8% were people aged 65 or older living alone. The average size of household was 2.55 and the average family size was 3.11.

The age distribution in the city was: 22.7% under 18, 7.9% from 18 to 24, 28.5% from 25 to 44, 28.0% from 45 to 64, and 12.9% over 64. The median age was 39.5 years. For every 100 females, there were 95.5 males. For every 100 females aged 18 and over, there were 93.3 males.

For the period 2009–2011, the estimated median annual income for a household in the city was $63,647, and the median income for a family was $71,091. Male full-time workers had a median income of $52,558, females $40,954. Per capita income was $30,039. About 4.2% of families and 6.8% of the population were below the poverty line, including 6.4% of those under 18 and 7.8% of those aged 65 or over.

Economy

Revitalization efforts

In December 2011, the City of Attleboro was awarded $5.4 million in state and federal funding to support revitalization efforts in its Historic Downtown area. The city's "Downtown Redevelopment and Revitalization Project" is intended to transform underutilized industrial and commercial parcels into areas of mixed use that include commercial, recreational, and residential space. The project includes transportation improvements to both MBTA rail and GATRA bus services along with enhanced road construction.

The city project was selected for the state Brownfield Support Team (BST) Initiative, which encourages collaboration between state, local, and federal government to address complex issues to help pave the way for economic development opportunities in cities and towns across Massachusetts. Contributing BST organizations include the MassDEP, Mass Development, the Department of Housing and Community Development (DHCD), and the MassDOT.

Congressman Jim McGovern highlighted the importance of this project in 2011 by saying,

Government
Attleboro is represented in the state legislature by officials elected from the following districts:
 Massachusetts Senate's Bristol and Norfolk district
 Massachusetts Senate's Norfolk, Bristol and Middlesex district
 Massachusetts House of Representatives' 2nd Bristol district
 Massachusetts House of Representatives' 14th Bristol district

Attractions
Attleboro has four museums.
The Attleboro Arts Museum
The Attleboro Area Industrial Museum,
The Women at Work Museum
The Museum at the Mill.

Other places of interest in the city include:

Capron Park Zoo;
L.G. Balfour Riverwalk, which was once the site of the L.G. Balfour jewelry plant, adjacent to the downtown business district
La Salette Shrine, which has a display of Christmas lights
Oak Knoll Wildlife Sanctuary, 75 acres owned by the Massachusetts Audubon Society with a visitor center
Triboro Youth Theatre / Triboro Musical Theatre;
Attleboro Community Theatre; *Dodgeville Mill.
Skyroc Brewery 
Attleboro Farmers Market 

In 2017, Attleboro began hosting the annual Jewelry City Steampunk Festival.

Infrastructure

Attleboro High School 

The former high school building was built in the 1960s on Rathbun Willard Drive. The city of Attleboro voted on whether to build a new school or renovate the building, and "reached an agreement to put proceeds from the sale toward the cost of a new high school before the $260 million was approved by voters last spring." The sale of the first Attleboro High School built in 1912 on County Street gave the city funds for the new building. The new Attleboro high school opened in 2022.

Transportation
Attleboro is beside Interstate 95 (which enters the state between Attleboro and Pawtucket, Rhode Island), I-295 (whose northern terminus is near the North Attleborough town line at I-95), US Route 1, and Routes 1A, 118, 123 and 152, the last three of which intersect at Attleboro center. The proposed Interstate 895 was to run through Attleboro and have a junction at the present day I-295/I-95 terminus. When driving from Rhode Island on I-295, the stub exits before the half-cloverleaf exit to I-95.

The city is home to two MBTA commuter rail stations: one in the downtown area and one in the South Attleboro district, near the Rhode Island border. Attleboro and Taunton are both served by the Greater Attleboro Taunton Regional Transit Authority, or GATRA, which provides bus transit between the two cities and the surrounding regions.

Education

Attleboro's school department has five elementary schools (Hill-Roberts, Hyman Fine, A. Irvin Studley, Peter Thacher and Thomas Willett), three middle schools (Brennan, Coelho and Wamsutta), and two high schools (Attleboro High School, and Attleboro Community Academy). Attleboro High School has its own vocational division, and its football team (the "Blue Bombardiers") has a traditional rivalry with North Attleborough High School, whom they play in their Thanksgiving Day football game. Attleboro Community Academy is a night school for students aged 16–25 to obtain their high school diplomas and could not function in traditional high school. Bishop Feehan High School is a co-educational Roman Catholic high school that opened in 1961 and is named for Bishop Daniel Francis Feehan, second Bishop of the Diocese of Fall River. The city also has a satellite branch of Bristol Community College, formerly housed in the city's former high school building but since relocated to an old Texas Instruments site. Bridgewater State University opened a satellite site in Attleboro in 2009, sharing space with Bristol Community College.

Religion

Religion reflects the historic ethnic makeup of the community. The Attleboro Area Interfaith Collaborative was founded in 1946 to serve the community.

There are three parishes in the Roman Catholic Diocese of Fall River:
St. John the Evangelist Parish, reflecting the English and Irish neighborhoods
St. Theresa of the Child Jesus Parish, reflecting the former French (now Hispanic) neighborhoods
St. Vincent de Paul Parish, reflecting the Portuguese neighborhoods

There are two Orthodox churches:
Holy Family Coptic Orthodox Church (Oriental Orthodoxy)
Holy Annunciation Greek Orthodox Church (Eastern Orthodoxy)

There are various Protestant churches:
Three in the Anglican Communion:
All Saints Episcopal Church was founded in 1890. It provides a traditional Anglican presence. 
All Saints Anglican Church in the Hebronville village split from the Episcopal church in town in 2007 over liberal policies of the denomination. This church is affiliated with an Anglican diocese in Uganda.
St. James Community Church (Kenyan)
Three Baptist churches:
First Baptist Church (American)
Grace Baptist Church (Independent Fundamental)
Word of Truth Baptist Church
Two Lutheran churches:
Good Shepherd Lutheran Church
Immanuel Lutheran Church

Second Congregational Church, United Church of Christ, founded near the town common in 1748, is typical of a New England town and is the founding church of what was then East Attleboro. It is a daughter church of the First Congregational (now Oldtown) Church of North Attleborough. Originally in a meeting house on what is now the common, it had a stately white clapboard building built in 1825. It was removed in the early 1950s to make way for a new Fellowship Hall and education rooms. The main red brick building and clock tower were built in 1904 beside the white church. In the early 1960s the interior of the sanctuary and the entrance were dramatically remodeled, resulting in a blend of high Victorian style and the open feel of mid-century modern. The church owns the Old Kirk Yard Cemetery to its rear, where many of the town's earliest families are buried. In its tower is the clock, owned originally by the city and now by the church. The Jack & Jill School has operated at the church for over 70 years. One of the city's elementary schools is named in honor of the church's first settled minister, the Reverend Peter Thacher.
Centenary United Methodist Church on North Main Street began on November 26, 1865, as a fellowship meeting in a building on Railroad Avenue. The first church building on the present site was dedicated in 1896 under the name of Davis Methodist Episcopal Church. The structure was destroyed by fire in 1883. The rebuilt church was named Centenary Methodist Episcopal Church in 1884, commemorating American Methodism's 100th anniversary. In 1998 Centenary and the Hebron Methodist were consolidated into one church.
Bethany Village Fellowship formed in 1886 as Bethany Congregational Church.
Evangelical Covenant Church founded in 1903 as the Swedish Evangelical Church on Pearl Street. The building was sold to Congregation Agudas Achim in 1911.
Good News Bible Chapel (1935), non-denominational
New Covenant Christian Fellowship, non-denominational (2006)
Advent Christian Church, National Association of Evangelicals
Attleboro Corps Community Center, The Salvation Army offers weekday and evening support services, including "Bridging the Gap" for adolescents.
Candleberry Chapel, non-denominational 
Crossroads International Church, Assembly of God in South Attleboro
Faith Alliance Church is a part of the Christian & Missionary Alliance
Fruit of the Spirit Mission Church, non-denominational
Seventh-day Adventist Church is located across from Capron Park
Spanish Seventh-day Adventist Church
United Pentecostal Church
Ark Celeste Christian Church
New Heart and New Spirit Church
Spanish Church of God
Iglesia La Familia De Dios
First Church of Christ, Scientist

Kingdom Hall of Jehovah's Witnesses

Congregation Agudas Achim is part of the Reconstructionist Judaism movement. The congregation formally started in 1911 with the purchase of the Swedish Evangelical Church on Pearl Street. The current synagogue was built in 1968.

Murray Unitarian-Universalist Church (1875)

The National Shrine of Our Lady of La Salette

In 1942, the Missionaries of La Salette purchased  and a castle in Attleboro for use as a seminary. The shrine opened to the public in 1953 with a Christmas manger display. The annual Christmas Festival of Lights has grown to 300,000 lights and attracts about 250,000 visitors each year. A devastating fire destroyed the castle on November 5, 1999. A new welcome center opened in 2007 which includes a 600-seat concert hall. In addition to the Christmas Festival, the shrine offers programs, concerts, workshops and events throughout the year. The grounds also include Our Lady's Chapel of Lights, an outdoor chapel, and a church.

Notable people

 Artine Artinian (1907–2005), scholar of French literature
 Cathy Berberian (1925–1983), composer, mezzo-soprano singer, and vocalist born in Attleboro
 Roger Bowen (1932–1996), comedic actor known for his portrayal of Lt. Col. Henry Blake in the 1970 film MASH; co-founder of comedy troupe The Second City
 George Bradburn (1806–1880), an American politician and Unitarian minister in Massachusetts, known for his support for abolitionism and women's rights
 Geoff Cameron (born 1985), professional soccer player
 Horace Capron (1804–1885), Union Army officer during the Civil War and later an agricultural advisor to Japan; his methods revolutionized Japanese agriculture
 David Cobb (1748–1830), major general of the Continental Army, speaker of the Massachusetts House of Representatives, United States Congressman from Massachusetts
 Ray Conniff (1916–2002), Easy listening recording artist
 Mark Coogan (born 1966), coach and retired American track athlete, first Massachusetts native to run the mile in under four minutes, placing 41st with a time of 2:20:27, after placing second in the U.S. Olympic Trials Marathon with at time of 2:13:05 
 David Daggett (1764–1851), United States Senator, associate justice of Connecticut Supreme Court, mayor of New Haven, Connecticut, and a founder of the Yale Law School
 Naphtali Daggett (1727–1780), Presbyterian clergyman, professor of divinity at Yale University, fought in the American Revolutionary War
 Gilbert Franklin (1919–2004), American sculptor, educator
 Paul G. Gaffney II, President, Monmouth University, US Navy Vice Admiral (Ret.), former Chief of Naval Research, President of National Defense University
 Steve Hagerty, 21st Mayor of Evanston, IL, and Founder and CEO of Hagerty Consulting, Inc
 Thomas Hobson, American actor, singer; Best known for his role as Shout in The Fresh Beat Band
 William Manchester (1922–2004), historian and biographer, author of The Death of a President
 Jonathan Maxcy (1768–1820), Baptist clergyman and president of Brown University
 Virgil Maxcy (1785–1844), member of the Maryland House of Delegates and the Maryland State Senate, later first solicitor of the treasury and chargé d'affaires at the United States embassy in Belgium
Christian Petersen (1885–1961), sculptor who worked as a die-cutter in Attleboro
 Helen Watson Phelps (1864–1944), painter
 Daniel Read (1757–1836), composer, who published 400 hymns in several collections
 Robert Rounseville (1914–1974), operatic tenor, who appeared in the films The Tales of Hoffmann and Carousel, and onstage in the original productions of the musicals Candide and Man of La Mancha
 Ken Ryan (born 1968), former pitcher for the Boston Red Sox and Philadelphia Phillies
 Howard Smith (1893–1968), American actor, singer
Abby Trott, voice actress and singer best known as the voice of Nezuko Kamado in the English dubs of Demon Slayer: Kimetsu no Yaiba and Demon Slayer: Kimetsu no Yaiba – The Movie: Mugen Train, and Ivy in Carmen Sandiego.
 Robert A. Weygand (born 1948), U.S. representative

See also
 List of mill towns in Massachusetts

References

External links

Attleboro History Site

Jewelry City Steampunk Festival

 
1634 establishments in Massachusetts
Cities in Bristol County, Massachusetts
Cities in Massachusetts
Populated places established in 1634
Providence metropolitan area